The Harlem Globetrotters are an American exhibition basketball team. They combine athleticism, theater, and comedy in their style of play. Over the years, they have played more than 26,000 exhibition games in 124 countries and territories, mostly against deliberately ineffective opponents, such as the Washington Generals (1953–1995, since 2015) and the New York Nationals (1995–2015). The team's signature song is Brother Bones' whistled version of "Sweet Georgia Brown", and their mascot is an anthropomorphized globe named "Globie". The team is owned by Herschend Family Entertainment.

History
The Globetrotters originated on the South Side of Chicago in 1926, where all the original players were raised. The Globetrotters began as the Savoy Big Five, one of the premier attractions of the Savoy Ballroom, opened in January 1928, a basketball team of Black American players that played exhibitions before dances due to declining dance attendance. In 1928, several players left the team in a dispute. That autumn, those players, formed a team called the "Globe Trotters" and toured southern Illinois that spring. Abe Saperstein became involved with the team as its manager and promoter. By 1929, Saperstein was touring Illinois and Iowa with his basketball team called the "New York Harlem Globe Trotters". Saperstein selected the name Harlem because it was then considered the center of Black American culture and the name Globetrotter to mythologize the team's international venues.

The Globetrotters were perennial participants in the World Professional Basketball Tournament, winning it in 1940. In a heavily attended matchup a few years later, the 1948 Globetrotters–Lakers game, the Globetrotters made headlines when they beat one of the best white basketball teams in the country, the Minneapolis Lakers. The Globetrotters continued to easily win games due to Harlem monopolizing the entire talent pool of the best black basketball players in the country. Once one of the most famous teams in the country, the Globetrotters were eventually eclipsed by the rise of the National Basketball Association, particularly when NBA teams began fielding black players in the 1950s. In 1950, Harlem Globetrotter Chuck Cooper became the first black player to be drafted in the NBA by Boston and teammate Nat "Sweetwater" Clifton became the first black player to sign an NBA contract when the New York Knicks purchased his contract from the Globetrotters for $12,500, with Harlem getting $10,000 and Clifton getting $2,500.

The Globetrotters gradually worked comic routines into their act—a direction the team has credited to Reece "Goose" Tatum, who joined in 1941—and eventually became known more for entertainment than sports. The Globetrotters' acts often feature incredible coordination and skillful handling of one or more basketballs, such as passing or juggling balls between players, balancing or spinning balls on their fingertips, and making unusually difficult shots.

In 1952, the Globetrotters invited Louis "Red" Klotz to create a team to accompany them on their tours. This team, the Washington Generals (who also played under various other names), became the Globetrotters' primary opponents. The Generals are effectively stooges for the Globetrotters, with the Globetrotters handily defeating them in thousands of games.

In 1959, the Globetrotters played nine games in Moscow after Saperstein received an invitation from Vasily Grigoryevich, the director of Lenin Central Stadium. The team, which included Wilt Chamberlain, was welcomed enthusiastically by spectators and authorities, they met Premier Nikita Khrushchev and collectively received the Athletic Order of Lenin medal.

However, according to one report, spectators were initially confused: "A Soviet audience of 14,000 sat almost silently, as if in awe, through the first half of the game. It warmed up slightly in the second half when it realized the Trotters are more show than competition." The Globetrotters brought their own opponent—not the Washington Generals, but the San Francisco Chinese Basketeers. A review in Pravda stated, "This is not basketball; it is too full of tricks" but praised the Globetrotters' skills and suggested that "they have some techniques to show us".

The American press—particularly Drew Pearson—made note of the fact that the Globetrotters were paid (per game) the equivalent of $4,000, which could be spent only in Moscow. The games were used as evidence that U.S.–Soviet relations were improving, that Moscow was backing off its criticism of race relations inside America, and that the USSR was becoming more capitalist (Pearson suggested that the games were held because Lenin Stadium needed money).

In May 1967, New York City–based Metromedia announced that it would acquire the Globetrotters for $1 million, but the deal was never completed and the team was later sold to George N. Gillett Jr., who soon formed a new company called Globetrotter Communications in 1968.

Nine years after the company's attempted acquisition in 1976, Metromedia announced that it would re-acquire the Globetrotters for $11 million from Globetrotter Communications.

Many famous basketball players have played for the Globetrotters. Greats such as "Wee" Willie Gardner, Connie "The Hawk" Hawkins, Wilt "The Stilt" Chamberlain, and Nat "Sweetwater" Clifton later joined the NBA. The Globetrotters signed their first female player, Olympic gold medalist Lynette Woodard, in 1985.

Because nearly all of the team's players have been black, and as a result of the buffoonery involved in many of the Globetrotters' skits, they drew some criticism during the Civil Rights era. The players were accused by some civil-rights advocates of "Tomming for Abe," a reference to Uncle Tom and owner Abe Saperstein. However, prominent civil rights activist Jesse Jackson (who would later be named an Honorary Globetrotter) came to their defense by stating, "I think they've been a positive influence... They did not show blacks as stupid. On the contrary, they were shown as superior."

In 1986, as part of the spin-off of  Metromedia's television stations to News Corporation and the 20th Century Fox film studio, the company sold the Globetrotters and the Ice Capades to the Minneapolis-based International Broadcasting Corporation (owners of KTAB-TV in Abilene, Texas and controlled by Thomas Scallen) for $30 million.

In 1993, former Globetrotters player Mannie Jackson purchased the team from the International Broadcasting Corporation, which was on the verge of bankruptcy.

In 1995, Orlando Antigua became the first Hispanic player on the team. He was the first non-black player on the Globetrotters' roster since Bob Karstens played with the squad in 1942–43.

While parts of a modern exhibition game are pre-planned, the games themselves are not fixed. While their opponents do not interfere with the Globetrotters' hijinks while on defense, they play a serious game when in possession of the ball and about 20 to 30 percent of a game is "real." This once led to an infamous defeat at the hands of the Washington Generals in 1971, to the distress of the watching crowd, after the Globetrotters lost track of a big lead with their tricks and the Generals hit a game-winning buzzer-beater.

In September 2005, Shamrock Holdings purchased 80% stake in the Globetrotters. 

In October 2013, Herschend Family Entertainment announced that it would acquire the Globetrotters from Shamrock Holdings.

In June 2021, the Globetrotters filed a petition to join the National Basketball Association (NBA) as an expansion franchise.

Current roster

Draft
Starting in 2007, the Globetrotters have conducted an annual "draft" a few days before the NBA draft, in which they select players they feel fit the mold of a Globetrotter. Being drafted by the Globetrotters does not guarantee a spot on the team, although several drafted players have gone on to become Globetrotters: Anthony "Ant" Atkinson (2007), Brent Petway (2007), William "Bull" Bullard (2008), Tay "Firefly" Fisher (2008), Charlie Coley III (2009), Paul "Tiny" Sturgess (2011), Jacob "Hops" Tucker (2011), Darnell "Spider" Wilks (2011), Bryan "B-Nice" Narcisse (2012), Tyrone Davis (2013), Corey "Thunder" Law (2013), Tyler "Iceman" Inman (2014) Devan "Beast" Douglas (2016), and AJ "Money" Merriweather.

Other notable draft picks by the Globetrotters include: Sun Mingming (2007), Patrick Ewing Jr. (2008), Sonny Weems (2008), Taylor Griffin (2009), Tim Howard (2009), Mark Titus (2010), Lionel Messi (2011), Jordan McCabe, then 12 years old (2011), Andrew Goudelock (2011), Usain Bolt (2012), Mariano Rivera (2013), Brittney Griner (2013), Johnny Manziel (2014), Landon Donovan (2014), Mo'ne Davis (2015), Dude Perfect (2015), Kevin Hart (2016), Neymar (2016), Missy Franklin (2016), Jordan Spieth (2016), Craig Sager (2016), Gal Gadot (2017), Aaron Judge (2017), Tim Tebow (2017), Paul Pogba (2018), Joseph Kilgore (2018), Thor Bjornsson (2018), Mahershala Ali (2019), Mookie Betts (2020), and Chadwick Boseman (2020).

Retired numbers
The Globetrotters have honored eight players by retiring their numbers:

In mass media/popular culture

Theatrical
 The Harlem Globetrotters, a 1951 feature film starring Marques Haynes and other Globetrotters, also featuring Thomas Gomez, Dorothy Dandridge, Bill Walker, and Angela Clarke. Young Bill Townsend drops out of college to join the famous independent Trotter team. He also finds romance along the way. "Goose" Tatum and fancy dribbler Haynes were the star players of the Globetrotters at the time and Saperstein was the owner. Tatum, Haynes, Babe Pressley, Ermer Robinson, Duke Cumberland, Clarence Wilson, Pop Gates, Frank Washington, Ted Strong, and other current team members appear in the film as themselves. Also featured is a lot of actual game footage (three times against the Celtics with Tony Lavelli and Big Bob Hahn), including the "Sweet Georgia Brown" warm-up routine. (Along with making the film, the team toured Major League Baseball stadiums that year and went on their first tour of South America.)
 Go, Man, Go! a 1954 prequel starring Dane Clark as Abe Saperstein and Sidney Poitier as Inman Jackson.

Television
 On December 19, 1956, twelve members of the Globetrotters appeared as guest challengers on the TV panel show What's My Line? Clarence Wilson acted as the spokesman and was accompanied by members George "Meadowlark" Lemon, Charlie Hoxie, Roman Turmon, Andy Johnson, Woodrow "Woody" Sauldsberry, Carl Green, Leon Hillard, Willie Gardner, and others.
 Harlem Globetrotters, a Hanna-Barbera Saturday morning cartoon, broadcast from September 12, 1970 to May 1973. Originally broadcast on CBS and later rerun on NBC as The Go-Go Globetrotters. The cartoon Globetrotters also guest-starred three times on The New Scooby-Doo Movies. Scatman Crothers provided the voice for Meadowlark Lemon's character on the show.
 The Harlem Globetrotters Popcorn Machine, a 1974 live-action Saturday morning variety show starring the Globetrotters that featured comedy skits, blackout gags, and educational segments. The show was produced by Funhouse Productions and Yongestreet Productions for CBS. The show also starred Rodney Allen Rippy and Avery Schreiber.
 The Super Globetrotters, a second animated series created by Hanna-Barbera for NBC in 1979. It featured the Globetrotters (now including new squad members James "Twiggy" Sanders, Nate Branch, and Louis "Sweet Lou" Dunbar) as undercover superheroes who would transform themselves by entering magic portable lockers carried in "Sweet Lou" Dunbar's afro or in a basketball-shaped medallion. Although the Super Globetrotters would first attempt to take on the villain with standard comical heroics, things would almost always be settled with a basketball game.
 In a 1979 episode of The White Shadow, the Globetrotters appear wherein Coach Reeves convinces the team to help him send his basketball team a reality check about overconfidence and underestimating their opponents as a result of a winning streak that got to his players' heads. The Globetrotters returned in season three (1980) when star player Warren Coolidge convinced that his basketball ability would preclude his need to finish high school, considers dropping out of school and trying out for the Globetrotters. After failing miserably in his tryout, Coolidge is persuaded to finish his education before giving any thought to a basketball career.
 The Harlem Globetrotters on Gilligan's Island, a 1981 made-for-TV film featured the Globetrotters alongside Bob Denver and the rest of the cast of Gilligan's Island. The film's plot follows the first animated series' formula to a degree with a conflict that ends with an unusual basketball game against an opposing team made up of robots. The Globetrotters decide to play with standard moves in the first half, which the robots are able to counter until Gilligan unwittingly comments that they have not done any fancy tricks. This makes the Professor advise the team to use their comedic style of play to win, which hopelessly confuses the machines. However, a couple of Globetrotters suffer injuries, and the team needs the help of Gilligan and Skipper to substitute.
 In "Hoopla" (1984), an episode of the television series The Love Boat, the Globetrotters are on a cruise and challenged the crew to a game in the dining room.
 In "Homie the Clown," an episode of the animated series The Simpsons, Krusty the Clown bets all the money he earned franchising his name against the Globetrotters in a game, saying that he "thought the Generals were due!" He then shouts "That game was fixed! They used a freakin' ladder for God's sake!"
 The animated series Futurama features several episodes in which the Harlem Globetrotters appear as brilliant scientists as well as basketball players living on another planet, the Globetrotter Homeworld. Ironically, the Harlem Globetrotters react harshly to anyone who "laughs at their antics" as evidenced in the episode "Time Keeps On Slippin'" (2001).
 The Globetrotters appeared in the 2000 comedy Little Nicky with Adam Sandler, wherein they are shown losing to the Washington Generals, which is caused by one of Nicky's demonic brothers.
 Harlem Globetrotters: The Team that Changed the World, a 2005 documentary featuring interviews with the Globetrotters, NBA coaches, and fans such as Samuel L. Jackson, Barack Obama, Phil Jackson, and Henry Kissinger—himself an honorary Globetrotter—and including photos of the Globetrotters with Pope John Paul II, who is also an honorary Globetrotter.
In the 6th episode of Hell’s Kitchen season 5, the Globetrotters made a special guest appearance teaching a young boy a few basketball tricks during his bar mitzvah.
In The Amazing Race: season 15 (2009), Herbert "Flight Time" Lang and Nathaniel "Big Easy" Lofton participated, finishing fourth place. They returned for season 18 (2011), which is subtitled "Unfinished Business," featuring fan-favorite teams who lost the competition because of various circumstances. The pair finished second overall. They also returned for season 24 (2014), dubbed an "All Star" season, featuring some of the shows fan favorites, this time finishing sixth.
 As part of the cross-promotion of The Amazing Race, Lang and Lofton also appeared on CBS Daytime's game show The Price Is Right to model prizes (a Sport Court basketball court) and present a showcase.
 In 2009 and 2010,<ref>{{IMDb title| id=1931370| title= 77th McDonald's Thanksgiving Parade (2010) (TV)}}</ref> members of the Harlem Globetrotters appeared on the nationally televised McDonald's Thanksgiving Day Parade in Chicago.
 In 2010, five members of the Globetrotters appeared on Are You Smarter Than a 5th Grader?, raising money for charity.
 On December 5, 2010, in a game televised on ESPN2 against the Washington Generals from HP Field House at the Walt Disney World Resort in Orlando, the game saw several landmark events occur. A penalty box was introduced as the price to be paid for any 'funny business' by a player. The Globetrotters made the first, and most, of the four-point shots in the game. All of the penalties in this game were assessed to the Globetrotters. The visiting Globetrotters went on to beat the Generals 104–98 in this historical game of firsts.
 Three members of the Globetrotters appear in the "Harlem NY" episode (2011) of Man v. Food Nation, in which they have to defeat a spicy two-pound barbecue sandwich in 15 minutes.
 Special K Daley, Ant Atkinson, and Blenda Rodriguez of the Globetrotters made a guest appearance in the October 18, 2011 episode of Sesame Street, in which they talk with the Muppet Elmo about the number 3.
 In 2012, the Globetrotters made a special guest appearance on Disney XD 's Kickin' It, in the episode "Eddie Cries Uncle."
 Three members of the Globetrotters appeared in a February 28, 2012 episode of the Blendtec online video series Will It Blend?, wherein they help Blendtec CEO Tom Dickson and his Uncle Floyd blend miniature basketballs, glitter dust, a whistle, and a bottle of Gatorade. The team then pour the mixture into a bucket, magically turning it into confetti, which they throw on Dickson.
 Globetrotter Bull Bullard competed on seasons four, five and six on American Ninja Warrior. In season four, he advanced to the finals but timed out on the first stage of the finals. Bullard competed on two additional seasons.
 Three members of the Harlem Globetrotters visited North Korea alongside Dennis Rodman in 2013, as seen in the HBO series Vice, becoming some of the first Americans to meet North Korean leader Kim Jong Un.
 On May 26, 2015, the Globetrotters appeared in the series premiere of I Can Do That.
 Three members of the Harlem Globetrotters appeared in the Dog with a Blog episode "Cat with a Blog."
 Five of the Globetrotters appeared as guest stars in the Mutt & Stuff episode "Basketball Dogs vs. The Harlem Globetrotters" on August 19, 2016.
 On December 7, 2016, the Globetrotters appeared on The Goldbergs. On March 19, 2018, Seth MacFarlane featured the Harlem Globetrotters in an American Dad! episode called "Klaustastrophe.tv."
 In 2009, a season 4 episode of Jon And Kate Plus 8 focused on the entire Gosselin family attending a Globetrotters game.

Video games
 In 1979, the Bally Manufacturing Corporation produced a coin operated, commercial pinball machine titled the Harlem Globetrotters on Tour. The pinball machine used solid state electronics and 14,550 units were produced.
 Harlem Globetrotters: World Tour'', a video game for the Game Boy Advance and the Nintendo DS

Honorary members
Ten people have been officially named as honorary members of the team:
Henry Kissinger (1976)
Bob Hope (1977)
Kareem Abdul-Jabbar (1989)
Whoopi Goldberg (1990)
Nelson Mandela (1996)
Jackie Joyner-Kersee (1999)
Pope John Paul II (2000) – Press agent Lee Solters arranged a ceremony orchestrated in front of a crowd of 50,000 in Saint Peter's Square in which the Pope was recognized as an honorary Globetrotter.
Jesse Jackson (2001) 
Pope Francis (2015)

Robin Roberts (2015)
In addition, Bill Cosby (1972) and Magic Johnson (2003) were each signed to honorary $1-a-year lifetime contracts with the Globetrotters. When Cosby's nominal association with the team was the subject of criticism following sexual assault allegations, the Globetrotters stated that they have had no association with him for decades.

Bibliography
 
  Retitled version of the above book, to coincide with the Go Man Go (film).
  Updated version of two previous books.
 
 
 
 
 "Ready-To-Read", Educational Book series featuring the Harlem Globetrotters

References

External links

 Harlem Globetrotters Official website
 Interview with Billy Ray Hobley
 Basketball Hall of Fame profile
 Harlem Globetrotters PR in Ireland
Voices of Oklahoma interview with Marques Haynes. First person interview conducted on December 28, 2011, with Marques Haynes, former member of the Harlem Globetrotters.
"In Black America; The Harlem Globetrotters 1985,"  1985-03-06,  KUT Radio, American Archive of Public Broadcasting (WGBH and the Library of Congress), Boston, MA and Washington, DC

 
1926 establishments in Illinois
articles containing video clips
basketball teams established in 1926
basketball teams in Chicago
basketball teams in New York City
Harlem
Herschend Family Entertainment
Metromedia
Naismith Memorial Basketball Hall of Fame inductees
sports entertainment
sports in Manhattan